Hendrik "Hein" Vos (5 July 1903 – 23 April 1972) was a Dutch politician of the defunct Social Democratic Workers' Party (SDAP) and later the Labour Party (PvdA) and economist.

Vos attended a Gymnasium in Heerenveen from April 1917 until May 1921 and applied at the Delft Institute of Technology in June 1921 majoring in Electrical engineering and obtaining a Bachelor of Engineering degree in June 1923 before graduating with a Master of Engineering degree in July 1927. Vos worked as a civil servant for the municipality of Deventer from July 1927 until September 1928 and for the Patent Office of the Ministry of Economic Affairs from September 1928 until July 1934. Vos served on the Municipal Council of Rijswijk from 1 September 1931 until 22 July 1934. Vos worked as a trade union leader for the Dutch Trade Unions association (NVV) from July 1934 until 8 June 1937 and as the director of the Social Democratic Workers' Party think tank from July 1934 until May 1940. Vos also served as editor-in-chief of the party newspaper  Vrijheid, Arbeid en Brood from June 1935 until May 1940. Vos served on the Municipal Council of Amsterdam from 3 September 1935 until 5 September 1939.

Vos was elected as a Member of the House of Representatives after the election of 1937, taking office on 8 June 1937 serving as a frontbencher and spokesperson for Economic Affairs. On 10 May 1940 Nazi Germany invaded the Netherlands and the government fled to London to escape the German occupation. During the German occupation Vos continued to serve as a Member of the House of Representatives in in name only but in reality the de facto political influence of the House of Representatives was marginalized by the German occupation authority. Following the end of World War II Queen Wilhelmina ordered the formation of a Government of National unity to serve as a caretaker capacity until the new election with Vos appointed as Minister of Commerce and Industry in the Cabinet Schermerhorn–Drees, taking office on 25 June 1945. On 9 February 1946 the Social Democratic Workers' Party (SDAP), the Free-thinking Democratic League (VDB) and the Christian Democratic Union (CDU) choose to merge to form the Labour Party (PvdA). After the election of 1946 Vos returned as a Member of the House of Representatives, taking office on 4 June 1946. Following the cabinet formation of 1946 Vos was appointed as Minister of Transport in the Cabinet Beel I, taking office on 3 July 1946. Vos served as acting Minister of Public Works and Reconstruction from 15 November 1946 until 3 March 1947 following the resignation Johan Ringers. On 1 March 1947 the Minister of Transport was renamed as the Minister of Transport and Water Management. After the election of 1948 Vos again returned as a Member of the House of Representatives, taking office on 27 July 1948. Following the cabinet formation of 1948 Vos was not giving a cabinet post in the new cabinet, the Cabinet Beel I was replaced by the Cabinet Drees-Van Schaik on 7 August 1948 and he continued to serve in the House of Representatives as a frontbencher and spokesperson for Economic Affairs and Small business.

In December 1948 Vos was named as chief executive officer (CEO) of the insurance company NV Centrale Algemene Levensverzekeringsmaatschappij, he resigned as a Member of the House of Representatives on 16 December 1948 and was installed as CEO on 1 January 1949. Vos remained in active in national politics, he served as Chairman of the Labour Party from 5 June 1953 until 23 February 1955. Vos was elected as a Member of the Senate after the Senate election of 1956, taking office on 6 November 1956 serving as a frontbencher and spokesperson for Finances and Agriculture. After the Senate election of 1960 Vos was selected as Parliamentary leader of the Labour Party in the Senate, taking office on 15 November 1960. In February 1968 Vos was nominated as a Member of the Council of State, he resigned as Parliamentary leader and as a Member of the House of Representatives on 16 February 1968 and was installed as a Member of the Council of State, taking office on 21 February 1968.

Vos was known for his abilities as a manager and policy wonk. He holds the distinction as the first known LGBT Member of the House of Representatives and government Minister of the Netherlands, this fact was an open secret in Dutch politics at that time.

Decorations

References

External links

Official
  Ir. H. (Hein) Vos Parlement & Politiek
  Ir. H. Vos (PvdA) Eerste Kamer der Staten-Generaal

 

 

 

 

 

 
 

 
 

1903 births
1972 deaths
Chairmen of the Labour Party (Netherlands)
Commanders of the Order of Orange-Nassau
Delft University of Technology alumni
Academic staff of the Delft University of Technology
Dutch agnostics
Dutch chief executives in the finance industry
Dutch chief executives in the media industry
Dutch civil engineers
Dutch financial writers
Dutch former Christians
Dutch magazine editors
Dutch nonprofit directors
Dutch nonprofit executives
Dutch political writers
Dutch trade union leaders
Former Calvinist and Reformed Christians
Gay politicians
Dutch gay writers
Knights of the Order of the Netherlands Lion
Labour Party (Netherlands) politicians
Dutch LGBT businesspeople
LGBT cabinet members of the Netherlands
LGBT members of the Parliament of the Netherlands
Macroeconomists
Members of the Council of State (Netherlands)
Members of the House of Representatives (Netherlands)
Members of the Senate (Netherlands)
Members of the Social and Economic Council
Ministers of Economic Affairs of the Netherlands
Ministers of Housing and Spatial Planning of the Netherlands
Ministers of Transport and Water Management of the Netherlands
Municipal councillors of Amsterdam
Municipal councillors in South Holland
People from Rijswijk
People from Opsterland
People from Nijkerk
People from Wassenaar
Social Democratic Workers' Party (Netherlands) politicians
Writers about activism and social change
20th-century Dutch businesspeople
20th-century Dutch civil servants
20th-century Dutch economists
20th-century Dutch engineers
20th-century Dutch male writers
20th-century Dutch politicians
20th-century Dutch LGBT people